Daniel Serra (born 2 April 1968) is a Spanish freestyle swimmer. He competed in two events at the 1988 Summer Olympics.

References

External links
 

1968 births
Living people
Spanish male freestyle swimmers
Olympic swimmers of Spain
Swimmers at the 1988 Summer Olympics
Swimmers from Barcelona
Mediterranean Games bronze medalists for Spain
Mediterranean Games medalists in swimming
Swimmers at the 1987 Mediterranean Games